Esch's Spur Bridge is a triple span stone arch bridge which crosses Grouse Creek near Dexter, Kansas.

It was listed on the National Register of Historic Places in 1985.

References

Bridges on the National Register of Historic Places in Kansas
Bridges completed in 1915
Cowley County, Kansas
Bridges in Kansas
Stone arch bridges in the United States